Settimio Lucci (born 21 September 1965) is an Italian professional football coach and a former player who played as a defender. He represented Italy at under-21 level. 

He played 9 seasons (204 games, 3 goals) in Serie A for Avellino, Roma, Empoli, Udinese and Piacenza. He played for Roma in the European Cup Winners' Cup.

Honours

Club
Roma
 Coppa Italia winner: 1985–86

International
Italy U21
 Represented Italy at the 1988 UEFA European Under-21 Championship

References

1965 births
Living people
People from Marino, Lazio
Italian footballers
Italy under-21 international footballers
Association football defenders
A.S. Roma players
U.S. Avellino 1912 players
Empoli F.C. players
Udinese Calcio players
Piacenza Calcio 1919 players
Hellas Verona F.C. players
Ternana Calcio players
A.C. Ancona players
Serie A players
Serie B players
Italian football managers
Footballers from Lazio
Sportspeople from the Metropolitan City of Rome Capital